Margaret Lynn von der Heide Spencer (born June 6, 1954, in Anchorage, Alaska) is a former, American cross-country skier who competed from 1975 to 1984. She finished seventh in the 4 × 5 km relay at the 1984 Winter Olympics in Sarajevo.

Spencer-Galanes' best World Cup career finish was ninth in a 10 km event in Canada in 1983.

Cross-country skiing results
All results are sourced from the International Ski Federation (FIS).

Olympic Games

World Championships

World Cup

Season standings

References

External links

Women's 4 x 5 km cross-country relay Olympic results: 1976-2002 

1954 births
Living people
American female cross-country skiers
Cross-country skiers at the 1976 Winter Olympics
Cross-country skiers at the 1980 Winter Olympics
Cross-country skiers at the 1984 Winter Olympics
Sportspeople from Anchorage, Alaska
Olympic cross-country skiers of the United States
21st-century American women